Andrew Moray may refer to:
 Andreas de Moravia (died 1242), Bishop of Moray, 1222–1242
 Andrew Moray (died 1297), joint-commander with William Wallace of the Scottish army at the Battle of Stirling Bridge
 Andrew Moray (justiciar) (died 1298), Lord of Petty, Justiciar of Scotia
 Andrew Murray (soldier) (1298–1338), his son who fought for David II

See also
 Andrew Murray (disambiguation)